The northern puffer, Sphoeroides maculatus, is a species in the family Tetraodontidae, or pufferfishes, found along the Atlantic coast of North America. Unlike many other pufferfish species, the flesh of the northern puffer is not poisonous (its viscera can contain poison). They are commonly called sugar toads in the Chesapeake Bay region, where they are eaten as a delicacy, it can even be eaten raw as long as its meat is properly cleaned. In much of the Northeast, the fish is known simply as "blowfish" or "chicken of the sea".

Description
The northern puffer is a club-shaped fish with a gray, brown, or olive back and a yellow or white belly.

Adults have small spines covering the entire body with a tiny beak-like mouth. Its color is poorly defined black/dark green spots and saddles and a yellow to white belly. It has tiny jet-black pepper spots (about 1 mm in diameter) scattered over most of pigmented surface, particularly evident on cheeks. Lower sides of the body have a row of black, elongate, bar-like markings. A small dorsal fin is set far back near the tail. Sphoeroides maculatus, like others in the puffer family, "puffs up" into a ball in self-defense by inhaling water into a special chamber near its stomach. They will puff up with air, if taken out of the water.

Habitat
It ranges from Florida (U.S.) to Newfoundland (Canada).

Diet

The northern puffer feeds primarily on shellfish, and occasionally on finfish. Using its beak-like mouth it can extract shellfish from their shells and sometimes break the shells to obtain a meal. They will attack blue crabs, blowing water underneath to turn the crab over, then attack the underside before it can right itself.

Life cycle

Little is known about the life cycle of the northern puffer. They spawn from May through August in shallow, nearshore waters. The female lays adhesive eggs that attach to the sandy or muddy bottom, and the male guards the eggs until they hatch.

References

Tetraodontidae
Fish described in 1801